The Burmo-Qiangic or Eastern Tibeto-Burman languages are a proposed family of Sino-Tibetan languages spoken in Southwest China and Myanmar. It consists of the Lolo-Burmese and Qiangic branches, including the extinct Tangut language.

Classification
Guillaume Jacques & Alexis Michaud (2011) argue for a Burmo-Qiangic branch of Sino-Tibetan (Tibeto-Burman) with two primary subbranches, Qiangic and Lolo-Burmese. Similarly, David Bradley (2008) proposes an Eastern Tibeto-Burman branch that includes Burmic ( Lolo-Burmese) and Qiangic. Bradley notes that Lolo-Burmese and Qiangic share some unique lexical items, even though they are morphologically quite different; whereas all Lolo-Burmese languages are tonal and analytical, Qiangic languages are often non-tonal and possess agglutinative morphology. However the position of Naic is unclear, as it has been grouped as Lolo-Burmese by Lama (2012), but as Qiangic by Jacques & Michaud (2011) and Bradley (2008).

Sun (1988) also proposed a similar classification that grouped Qiangic and Lolo-Burmese together.

Jacques' & Michaud's (2011) proposed tree is as follows.

Bradley's (2008) proposal is as follows. Note that Bradley calls Lolo-Burmese Burmic, which is not to be confused with Burmish, and calls Loloish Ngwi.

However, Chirkova (2012) doubts that Qiangic is a valid genetic unit, and considers Ersu, Shixing, Namuyi, and Pumi all as separate Tibeto-Burman branches that are part of a Qiangic Sprachbund, rather than as part of a coherent Qiangic phylogenetic branch. This issue has also been further discussed by Yu (2012).

Lee & Sagart (2008) argue that Bai is a Tibeto-Burman language that has borrowed very heavily from Old Chinese. Lee & Sagart (2008) note that word relating to rice and pig agriculture tend to be non-Chinese, and that the genetic non-Chinese layer of Bai shows similarities with Proto-Loloish.

Branches
Yu (2012:206–207) lists the following well-established coherent branches (including individual languages, in italics below) that could likely all fit into a wider Burmo-Qiangic group, in geographical order from north to south.

(Baima) [possible Burmo-Qiangic substratum]
Qiang
rGyalrong
Lavrung
Ergong
Choyo
nDrapa
Guiqiong
Minyak
Ersuic
Namuyi
Shixing
Naish
Prinmi
Lolo-Burmese
(Bai) [possible Burmo-Qiangic substratum]

Additionally, Tangut, now extinct, is generally classified as a Qiangic language.

Yu (2012:215-218) notes that Ersuic and Naic languages could possibly group together, since they share many features with each other that are not found in Lolo-Burmese or other Qiangic groups.

Proto-language reconstructions for some of these branches include:
Proto-Rma (Sims 2017)
Proto-Prinmi (Sims 2017)
Proto-Ersuic (Yu 2012)
Proto-Naish (Jacques & Michaud 2011)
Proto-Lolo-Burmese (Matisoff 2003)
Proto-Bai (Wang 2006)

Lexical evidence
Jacques & Michaud (2011) list the following lexical items as likely Burmo-Qiangic lexical innovations.

See also
Bailang language

References

 Bradley, David. 1997. "Tibeto-Burman languages and classification". In D. Bradley (Ed.), Tibeto-Burman languages of the Himalayas (Papers in South East Asian linguistics No. 14) pp. 1–71, Canberra: Pacific Linguistics. .
 Bradley, David. 2008. The Position of Namuyi in Tibeto-Burman. Paper presented at Workshop on Namuyi, Academia Sinica, Taiwan, 2008.
 Jacques, Guillaume, and Alexis Michaud. 2011. "Approaching the historical phonology of three highly eroded Sino-Tibetan languages." Diachronica 28:468-498.
 Lama, Ziwo Qiu-Fuyuan (2012), Subgrouping of Nisoic (Yi) Languages, thesis, University of Texas at Arlington (archived)
 Sūn, Hóngkāi 孙宏开. 1988. Shilun woguo jingnei Zang-Mianyude puxi fenlei 试论我国境内藏缅语的谱系分类. (A classification of Tibeto-Burman languages in China). In: Tatsuo Nishida and Paul Kazuhisa Eguchi (eds.), Languages and history in East Asia: festschrift for Tatsuo Nishida on the occasion of his 60th birthday 61-73. Kyoto: Shokado.

External links
Burmo-Qiangic (Sino-Tibetan Branches Project)

 
 

br:Yezhoù jingpoek-konyakek-bodoek
de:Bodo-Konyak-Jingpho-Sprachen